30 Hari Mencari Cinta (roughly translated as "Looking For Love in 30 Days") is a 2004 Indonesian romantic comedy film drama directed by Upi Avianto and starring Maria Agnes. Music for the film was composed by Andi Rianto.

Cast 
 Maria Agnes as Olin
 Vino G. Bastian as Erik
 Luna Maya as Barbara
 Dinna Olivia as Keke
 Revaldo as Bono
 Rionaldo Stockhorst as Axel
 Nirina Zubir as Gwen

External links 
 

2004 films
2000s Indonesian-language films
2004 romantic comedy films
Films shot in Indonesia
Indonesian romantic comedy films